Kennedyplatz is a plaza in the German city of Essen. It was laid out on a previously densely-built site which had been destroyed in the Second World War. Today, the area serves as an inner-city event space.

Previously known as the Gildenplatz, the square was renamed on 17 December 1963 in memory of US president John F. Kennedy, who was assassinated the previous month.

References

Essen